Matt Riddlehoover (born July 26, 1985) is an American filmmaker. He is best known for the 2020 documentary My Darling Vivian.

My Darling Vivian 

Riddlehoover produced, directed, and edited My Darling Vivian, a biographical documentary about Vivian Liberto, the first wife of Johnny Cash. The film premiered at the 2020 South by Southwest Film Festival, presented by Amazon Prime Video, to great acclaim. It was hailed by The Hollywood Reporter and the Los Angeles Times as a “must-see” critics' pick, and Newsweek ranked it among the best films of the year. My Darling Vivian went on to screen at festivals around the world, including Geena Davis’ Bentonville Film Festival, where Riddlehoover received the Special Jury Award for Excellence in Editing.

Selected filmography

Awards and nominations

Film festival awards

References

External links 

Official Website of Matt Riddlehoover

1985 births
American film directors
American male screenwriters
Living people
American gay actors
LGBT film directors